Somers is a surname. Notable people with the surname include:

Adeline Marie Somers (1852–1920), British humanitarian and advocate for penal reform
Alan Somers (born 1941), American swimmer
Alex Somers (born 1984), American visual artist and musician; partner of Jónsi
Andrew Lawrence Somers (1895–1949), American (New York) politician
Armonía Somers (1914–1994), Uruguayan feminist, pedagogue, novelist and short story writer
Art Somers (1902–1992), Canadian ice hockey player
Arthur Somers-Cocks, 6th Baron Somers (1887–1944), British Army officer, Governor of Victoria 1926–31
Bart Somers (born 1964), Belgian politician, Minister-President of Flanders 2003-04
Brett Somers (1924–2007), Canadian-born American actress, singer, and comedian
Charles Somers (1868–1934), American executive and investor in baseball
Daryl Somers (born 1951), Australian television personality
George Somers, (1554–1610), British admiral who founded the colony of Bermuda in 1609
Hans Somers (born 1978), Belgian football midfielder
Harry Somers (1925–1999), Canadian composer and pianist
Jeff Somers (born 1971), American science fiction author
John Somers, 1st Baron Somers 1651–1716, Lord Chancellor of England under William III
John Somers-Smith (1887–1916), British rower
Joseph Somers (cyclist) (1917–1966), Belgian racing cyclist
Joseph Somers (artist) (born 1950s/60s), American artist
Julian Somers (1903–1976), English stage and screen actor
Kelly Somers (born 1986), English sports presenter and reporter 
Linda Somers (born 1961), American long-distance runner
Luke Somers (1981–2014), British-American photojournalist who was kidnapped in 2013
Marc Somers (born 1961), Belgian racing cyclist
Marlies Somers (born 1973), Dutch voice actress
Peter Somers (1878–1914), Scottish footballer
Peter J. Somers (1850–1924), American politician, mayor of Milwaukee, Wisconsin
Richard Somers (1778–1804), officer of the United States Navy
Steve Somers (born 1947), radio host on the New York City sports radio station WFAN
Suzanne Somers (born 1946), American actress
Thomas Somers (athlete) (born 1997), British sprinter 
Vaughan Somers (born 1951), Australian golfer
Walter Somers (1839–1917), English industrialist
Wieki Somers (born 1976), Dutch designer

See also
Jane Somers, pseudonym used for two novels by British writer Doris Lessing (1919–2013)
Sommers (surname)
Zomer, Dutch surname

Dutch-language surnames
English-language surnames